Grigori (Geliy) Lazarevich Aronov (Григо́рий (Ге́лий) Ла́заревич Аро́нов, born 1 January 1923 in Pochep; died 1 July 1984 in Pochep) was a Soviet film director, actor, and screenwriter. He co-directed The Seventh Companion, also the debut of Aleksei Yuryevich German.

References

External links 

1923 births
1984 deaths
Soviet film directors
Soviet screenwriters
20th-century Russian screenwriters
Male screenwriters
20th-century Russian male writers
Gerasimov Institute of Cinematography alumni